Music from and Inspired by the Motion Picture Black and White is the soundtrack to James Toback's 1999 drama film Black and White. It was released on March 28, 2000 through Loud Records, shortly before the film was released to theaters, and consists entirely of hip hop music. The album peaked at #124 on the Billboard 200 albums chart and at #43 on the Top R&B/Hip-Hop Albums chart in the United States.

Track listing

Chart history

References

External links

2000 soundtrack albums
Hip hop soundtracks
Loud Records soundtracks
Albums produced by Melvin "Mel-Man" Bradford
Albums produced by Mark Batson
Albums produced by the Infinite Arkatechz
Drama film soundtracks